Rozhdestvenskoye is a rural locality (a selo) in Yugo-Kamskoye Rural Settlement, Permsky District, Perm Krai, Russia. The population was 424 as of 2010. There are 9 streets.

Geography 
Rozhdestvenskoye is located 75 km southwest of Perm (the district's administrative centre) by road. Novy is the nearest rural locality.

References 

Rural localities in Permsky District